Jorge Luis Batlle Ibáñez (Batlle locally  or ; 25 October 1927 – 24 October 2016) was a Uruguayan politician and lawyer, and a member of the Colorado Party. He served as the President of Uruguay from 2000 to 2005.

Dr. Jorge Batlle became Uruguayan president on 1 March 2000, after having been elected the previous year by popular vote. He was the fourth Uruguayan President belonging to the Batlle family, one of whom was his own father, Luis Batlle Berres. Bearing a name that is closely related to the political history of the country, Batlle began his political career in the 1950s and had served as member of the Uruguayan Congress for the Colorado Party, to which many members of his own family – which came to the River Plate from the Catalan coast at Sitges, Spain, 200 years ago – had belonged before him.

Early life
Batlle was born in 1927, son of Luis Batlle Berres and Matilde Ibáñez Tálice. He has two siblings, Luis (d. May 25, 2016) and Matilde. His ancestors include the Uruguayan presidents Jose Batlle y Ordonez and Lorenzo Batlle.

By 1958, when he was first elected Congressman for the Colorado Party, Dr. Batlle – who had obtained his Diploma in Law and Social Sciences from the University of the Republic in 1956 - had been active in journalism both in Radio "Ariel" and the newspaper "Acción". He was also by that time a member of the governing body of his Party. He unsuccessfully ran for president in 1966, and was part of a financial scandal in 1968, which was never proven. He ran for president again in 1971, without success.

During the period of civilian-military administration in Uruguay (1973–1985), Dr. Batlle did not occupy any legislative or official position, having been banned from political activity by decree. He was detained on several occasions. He did preside over the Legislative General Assembly in February 1985, when the first democratically elected Congress was seated after the military interregnum. He has a very active legislative record. Dr. Batlle was also a leading promoter and drafter of two Constitutional Amendments, one in 1966 and the other more recently in 1996. He was defeated again in the 1989 and 1994 presidential elections, and won the 1999 elections, taking office in 2000.

Presidency

Batlle took office at a particularly difficult moment for Uruguay, as an economic depression led the country 2002 Uruguay banking crisis and close to sovereign default, and a third of the population below the poverty line. Batlle's determination to reduce public spending, aimed at preserving the macroeconomic balance, made it possible for Uruguay to be highly regarded as a country with a sound management of its economic affairs. US president George W. Bush helped him to prevent default with $1.5 billion in credit.

His administration had to deal with a foot-and-mouth disease outbreak, which threatened access of Uruguayan beef to international markets. Before the end of his term, Uruguay had re-gained disease-free status.

Batlle firmly backed MERCOSUR, which he saw as instrumental for an open regional integration into the world economy. He favoured strengthening MERCOSUR by forming associations such as the one envisaged in the so-called "4+1" agreement with the United States. He maintained close diplomatic ties with the US at a time when the Pink tide in Latin America was marked by several regional governments that distanced themselves from the US. He had a diplomatic conflict with Cuba, as he criticised the human rights record of the Castro's regime.

In 2002, he deals with the law on the legalization of prostitution.

He proposed the legalization of cocaine, as a way to reduce the political clout of drug cartels.

He was also in favour of the creation of the Free Trade Association of the Americas (FTAA). As president, Batlle was firmly set against protectionism and subsidies of any kind; he has been a consistent spokesman for unhampered free trade.

Later life
Jorge Batlle stayed active in politics after the end of his presidency. He criticised the Uruguayan presidents that succeeded him (Tabaré Vázquez and José Mujica) through newspapers columns and social media.

Death
Jorge Batlle fainted and struck his head after he fainted and fell during an event at the Colorado party. He was hospitalized at the Sanatorio Americano hospital, and underwent surgery to stop an intracranial hemorrhage. The operation failed, and he died on 24 October 2016, one day shy of his 89th birthday. Uruguay declared a day of national mourning upon his death.

See also
 Politics of Uruguay
 List of political families#Uruguay

References

External links

Biography and tenure by CIDOB (in Spanish)
https://web.archive.org/web/20060223060355/http://www.presidencia.gub.uy/pages/curric_eng.htm

1927 births
2016 deaths
People from Montevideo
 
Uruguayan people of Catalan descent
Colorado Party (Uruguay) politicians
Presidents of Uruguay
Members of the Chamber of Representatives of Uruguay (1959–1963)
Members of the Chamber of Representatives of Uruguay (1963–1967)
Members of the Senate of Uruguay (1985–1990)
Members of the Senate of Uruguay (1995–1990)
20th-century Uruguayan lawyers
University of the Republic (Uruguay) alumni
Children of presidents of Uruguay
Recipients of the Medal of Military Merit (Uruguay)
Deaths from head injury
Burials at the Central Cemetery of Montevideo